Emīlija Sonka (born 4 November 1939 in Kuldīga, Latvia) is a former track and road cyclist from Latvia. She won the gold medal at the 1964 Road World Championships in the road race (representing USSR).

References

External links 
 

1939 births
Living people
Latvian female cyclists
Soviet female cyclists
People from Kuldīga
Honoured Masters of Sport of the USSR
UCI Road World Champions (women)